The Heart of Woman, also known as Women, is a Taiwanese Hokkien television series that began airing on SET Taiwan in Taiwan on 21 November 2012, from Mondays to Fridays, and ends on 21 November 2013, lasting one year with a total of 262 episodes.

Cast
The cast are listed according to the families they belong to in the drama.

1st Generation cast
Main cast
 Norman Chen as Chen Yingqi/Xu Shaoqiang
 Pally Chien as Li Tianxin/Zhang Ting Ting
 Huang Yu Rong as Li Weiming
 Joanne Lien as Liu Shi Mei
 Eric Huang as Anthony Yang Le Duo
 Jean Kao as Sun Bao Er/Chen Xiao Xiao

Chens
 Shi Feng as Chen Chang Hui
 Chen Shufang as Chen Lin Yue
 Vins Wang Yi-Cheng as Chen Haowen
 Doris Kuang as Yang Qiumei
 Jessie Chang as Chen Haoping
 Hsing Hui as Chen Xiao Xiao

Yans
 Franco Chiang as Yan Guo Feng
 Chen Liangzhe as Wang Qitai
 Vicky Ceng as Zhao Yuhui
 Qiu Chen-en as Yan Zhi-long

Wangs
 Lin Xiuling as Wang Jinfeng

Suns
 Henry Yang as Sun Zhengdong
 He Yi Pei as Sun Xue Er

Lees
 Josh Huo as Li Minglong
 Chen Yi as Lisa Xie Liling

Lius
 Joseph Hsia as Liu De Hua
 Lü Hsueh-feng as Lu Yulian/Li Ruifang
 Lin Youxing as Liu Junjie

Liaos
 Cheng Chih-Wei as Liao Jianghu
 Joyce Cai as Liao Yao Mei

Xus
 Lung Shao-hua as Xu Yongye
 Charry Lin as Zhang Wenjuan

2nd Generation Cast
Main Cast
 Eric Huang as Lin Jia Hao
 Pally Chien as Jiang Yu Hua
 Li Yi as Huang Yi Cheng/Jiang Yuanqi
 Penny Lin as Gao Nian Ci
 Joyce Yu as Xiao Zhen/Guo Yizhen/Hong Yi Zhen

Jiangs
 Yang Lie as Jiang Da Hai/Jiang Tianshen
 Ting Chen as Jiang Qianghua
 Wang Qi as Young Jiang Qianghua
 Lan Jing Heng as Jiang Yuan Long

Lins
 On Xuebin as Lin Zhong Xing
 Su Yi Jing as He Shumin/Mu Dan
 Lian Yu Ting as Lin Guangyi
 Liu Xiaoyi as Wang Feng Jiao

Fangs
 Kelly Ko as Luo Yue Li
 Debby Yang as Cai Chunjiao
 Eric Ma as Fang Qingchang
 Angel Huang as Man Na
 Xiao Jinghong as Fang Li Xiang

Gaos
 Wang Hao as Gao Shou

Dings
 Leo Ting as Ding Yao Wu

Hongs
 Li Luo as Hong Jian Hui
 Ting Kuo-Lin as Peng Ai Fei

Guos
 Yue Hung as Guo Yan Hong
 Pan Yian as Guo You Da

Qius
 Lin An Di as Tuo La Ku
 Lin Yu-Zi as Huang Li Li
 Wang Yuefeng as Xiao Shuai
 Livia Lin as Xiao Shan
 Wang Zhengxun as Xiao Zhi

Zhaos
 Sean Su as Zhao Meng
 Viola Fang as Xiao Yun

Wang Lai Fa's Family
 Zhang Youming as Wang Lai Fa
 Elissa Jing as Wang Xuan Xuan

Ye's
 Xu Zi Ting as Melody Ye Hui Zhen
 Eason Zhao as Winnie
 Nie Bingxian as Xie Zhengtang

Other casts
 Dong Shunhao as Mark
 Lin Yu-Shun as Ma Sha
 Xu Zi Zhan as Ah Chun
 Ceng Yi Qing as Fanny
 Stacy Chou as Gao Ai Lun
 Chen Jianlong as Liu Yubin
 Kao Ming-Wei as Goh Lu Qi
 Shen Hong as Xiao Ling Ling
 Lan Wei Hua as Zhang Jianliang
 Su Lixuan as Andy
 Miao Zhen as Betty
 He Guanying as Tie Xiong
 Lu Biao as Tian Fu
 Liao Jin De as Inspector Xiao
 Zhu Yongde as Si-xian
 Guo Yunze as Ah Hao
 NoVa Yeh as Arnold
 Lin Xiaolou as Amy Chen

Guest cast
 Calvin Lee as George
 You Long Shu as Zheng Hong Gui
 Emerson Tsai as A-chang
 Tang Zhen as Tang Xiaohui
 Wen Ke Xian as Cai Xiao Min
 Han Yuen as Tiona
 Angela Ye Hua as Zhao Yanjun
 Qi Shang-yuan as Yan Jun
 Mark Dai as Qiu Xianyou
 Hong Ruixia as Hong Hua
 Zheng Yingxiong as Zheng Hei Gui
 Wan Hong Gui as Wu Zengzan
 Zhao Shun as Gu Xiao Zhou
 Lin Yingcheng as Gu Yaxing
 Amanda Fan as Gu Yaping
 Hsiao Hou Tao as Lin Wanfu
 Abel An as Paul
 Lan Yi Ping as Lin Wang Yao
 He Man Ning as Yang Guizhi
 Lin Zhiwei as Lin Chun Tao
 Cai Shengwei as Chen Fu Gui

International broadcast

Malaysia broadcast
The drama was broadcast on 8TV in original Hokkien language under the English title The Heart of Woman from Monday to Friday, at 18:00 MST starting 18 February 2014.

References

Taiwanese drama television series
2012 Taiwanese television series debuts
2013 Taiwanese television series endings
Hokkien-language television shows
Sanlih E-Television original programming